Unity Roots and Family, Away (also known as UR&FA) is the eighth released album from the Japanese rock band Glay. It reached #1 on Oricon charts and sold about 436,180 copies. In this album Glay takes a new turn and dabbles in genres such as gospel, R&B and blues. The band's leader, Takuro, wanted an album made for the people closest to him, which resulted in "UR&FA".

"...people like my family members, lovers, friends, staff, acquaintance relationships, and the people I have around me greatly influence my work, and I wanted to make one album about that. My keyword was "roots". And, after that I had "unity". ...I wanted to do this theme one time. We did a gospel sound in order to represent these people the closest." (Takuro)

Track listing
We All Feel His Strength of Tender - 6:41
 - 3:54
Girlish Moon - 6:22
Way of Difference - 4:45
 - 4:59
 - 4:58
 - 2:54
Neverland - 3:33
 - 2:59
Father & Son - 4:04
 - 4:52
Friend of Mine - 6:04
All Standard Is You -End Roll- (Arranged by Glay, Masahide Sakuma, and dj honda) - 4:16
 All lyrics and compositions by Takuro, except #8 (music by Jiro), musical arrangements by Glay and Masashide Sakuma, except when noted.

Album chart information
Oricon Top Ranking: #1
Weeks on: 16
Overall Glay Ranking: #8
(NOTE: Overall Glay Ranking is how it is ranked against Glay's other albums according to the Oricon)

References
 Oricon - Glay's profile on the Oricon
 Happy Swing Space Site - Official Site

Glay albums
2002 albums
Pony Canyon albums